Kyle Edward Bornheimer (born September 10, 1975) is an American actor and comedian known for his roles on the sitcoms Worst Week, Brooklyn Nine-Nine, Casual, and Playing House.

Life and career
Bornheimer was born in Mishawaka, Indiana, where he attended St. Monica Grade School and Marian High School, graduating in 1994. Bornheimer is a founding member of The Curtainbox Theatre Company.

With a string of national commercials, Bornheimer established an "always on TV" reputation with 30-second spots for such national accounts as Geico, Staples, Coors Light, Imodium, Stanley and T-Mobile.

He landed the lead of Sam Briggs on the sitcom Worst Week. He starred with Alyssa Milano on the TV sitcom Romantically Challenged. The series premiered on ABC on April 19, 2010, but ABC officially canceled the series on May 16, 2010.

In Breaking Bad, he played Ken, an obnoxious stockbroker who gets his car blown up by Walter White in the Season 1 episode "Cancer Man", and later reprised his role as the character in the prequel Better Call Saul, as the victim of a prank pulled by Jimmy McGill and Kim Wexler in the Season 2 episode "Switch". Bornheimer has also been featured in episodes of Better Off Ted, The Office, Brooklyn Nine-Nine, and Party Down. More recently, Bornheimer starred in the NBC sitcom Perfect Couples opposite Olivia Munn, David Walton, and Hayes MacArthur and in the ABC sitcom Family Tools with J.K. Simmons and Leah Remini.

In 2016, Bornheimer appeared on the CBS sitcom Angel from Hell. His feature film credits include She's Out of My League, You Again, and Bachelorette. He also made two appearances in Judd Apatow's Netflix series Love.

Filmography

Films

Television

References

External links

1975 births
21st-century American male actors
American male film actors
American male television actors
American male voice actors
Living people
Male actors from Indiana
People from Mishawaka, Indiana
American people of German descent